F. P. Kyei was a Ghanaian police officer who served as Inspector General of Police of the Ghana Police Service from 27 November 1979 to 6 October 1981.

References

Date of birth missing
Ghanaian police officers
Ghanaian Inspector Generals of Police
1940 births
2018 deaths